Hotat Bani Tamim is a Saudi Arabian town, adjacent to Riyadh. Its population is about 40,000. Most of the residents are from the Tamimi tribe. Hotat Bani Tamim is located 135 km south of Riyadh's southern ring road, and slightly northeast of the Ibex Reserve Protected Area.

Transportation

The town is linked with a new highway with the capital Riyadh to be 153 km. Recently, the government agreed a plan to build a new domestic airport in the town to serve the southern Riyadh towns such as: Al-kharj and Hotat Bani tamim.

See also 

 List of cities and towns in Saudi Arabia
 Regions of Saudi Arabia

References

Populated places in Riyadh Province